The Black Circus Part 1: Letters is a concept album released by Manticora in 2006.

It is inspired by the works of H. P. Lovecraft and is spread over two different recordings, with The Black Circus Part 2: Disclosure finishing the story.

Track listing 
Enter the Carnival
The Black Circus
Intuneric I
Enchanted Mind
Intuneric II
Forever Carousel
Freakshow
Gypsies' Dance Part 1
Intuneric III
Wisdom
Intuneric IV
Disciples of the Entities
Bonus tracks
Soul Devourer (Japan)

2006 albums
Manticora (band) albums
Concept albums
Locomotive Music albums
Cthulhu Mythos music